State Route 154 (SR-154) or Bangerter Highway (named after former Utah Governor Norman H. Bangerter) is a partial expressway running west and then north from Draper through western Salt Lake County, eventually reaching the Salt Lake City International Airport in Salt Lake City. Construction began in 1988 after planning for the highway began more than two decades prior. For the next ten years, portions of the highway opened as constructed, with the entire route finished by 1998.

Original plans for the six-lane expressway running through the western suburbs of Salt Lake City placed Bangerter Highway running further north past the Salt Lake City International Airport into Davis County. However, any route north of the airport never reached fruition, whereas the original southerly end of the route was extended from Redwood Road to I-15.

Route description
State Route 154 (Bangerter Highway) begins just southeast of a single-point urban interchange at I-15 at the intersection of 13800 South in the Salt Lake City suburb of Draper. The three-lane road curves from the north to the west and widens to four lanes before accessing the I-15 interchange. Past the freeway exit, SR-154 expands to three lanes in each direction with a median barrier in the center.  With the exception of two variations in the course of the road prior to an intersection at Redwood Road (SR-68), the highway heads relatively due west (there is a dip to the south for about a mile as the roadway crosses the Jordan River). Throughout its whole route, with four exceptions (I-15, SR-68, SR-48, SR-201, and I-80), SR-154 intersects only major cross streets at grade-level intersections. The route runs into the boundary of Bluffdale and Riverton before definitively entering Riverton boundaries when the highway makes a northerly curve.

Making a slight easterly jog in the process, the road maintains its six-lane divided-highway setup as it intersects 13400 South, 12600 South (SR-71) and 11400 South (SR-175 and the access road to Daybreak and the Oquirrh Mountain LDS Temple). Arriving in South Jordan, more cross streets intersect Bangerter Highway (South Jordan Parkway SR-151 and 9800 South) before the route traverses into West Jordan.  There is no at-grade intersection at 9000 South and 7800 South SR-48, but an overpass with on- and off- ramps, permitting easy access to South Valley Regional Airport and allowing uninterrupted traffic flow on Bangerter.  SR-154 continues, intersecting 7000 South (access to Jordan Landing) and Bennion Boulevard (6200 South). The route slides to the west, entering Taylorsville and crossing 5400 South via overpass with on- and off-ramps  (SR-173) and 4700 South.

As SR-154 enters West Valley City, it intersects 4100 South, 3500 South (SR-171), and 3100 South. The highway curves northwest, intersecting with Parkway Boulevard (2700 South), Lake Park Boulevard (2400 South), and 2100 South before meeting SR-201 (21st South Freeway) at a diverging diamond interchange and entering Salt Lake City. Losing one lane in each direction, the route meanders northerly toward the Airport, crossing 1820 South and California Avenue (1300 South) before meeting at a cloverleaf interchange at I-80 and terminating at the access road to the Airport.

History

Planning and construction 
Planning for the West Valley Highway began in the 1960s as a local federal-aid project. The proposed alignment began at the curve in SR-68 near 15300 South and proceeded north-northwesterly and northerly, following a path much like the present alignment to I-80. It continued north along what was then the west boundary of the then Salt Lake City Municipal Airport No. 1 (now Salt Lake City International Airport) into 4000 West, curving east onto 2200 North and ending at I-215. A drainage canal was moved to make room for a loop from 2200 North onto northbound I-215, but when the Interstate was finished south of 2200 North (where it had ended for many years) in the mid-1980s, a diamond interchange was built instead. Later the north segment was rerouted to continue north-northeasterly from the airport into Davis County; parts of this are now the Legacy Parkway. Salt Lake County was able to build the highway between SR-201 (2100 South) and I-80 with federal funding, but it took the state to finish it.

In 1989, the Utah Transportation Commission added a portion of the proposed West Valley Highway to the state highway system as State Route 154. A newly proposed corridor ran west from I-15 near 13400 South to near 3200 West, where it joined the older proposal and headed north to I-80. With the help of Governor Norman H. Bangerter, longtime resident of West Valley City, the project received needed money from the state's general fund, and was opened between SR-201 (2100 South) and SR-171 (3500 South) on November 26, 1991. The Transportation Commission renamed the highway after Bangerter in May 1993. It was finally completed to I-15 on November 17, 1998.

Improvements

Continuous-flow intersections 

In 2007, a continuous flow intersection was constructed at the junction of SR-154 and SR-171 (3500 South), one of a very few such intersections in the United States. The intersection is one of the busiest in the state and handles 100,000 vehicles on a typical weekday.  In 2011, five more intersections were upgraded to continuous-flow intersections (3100 South, 4100 South, 5400 South/SR-173, 6200 South, and 7000 South) as part of the Bangerter 2.0 project. Another CFI was completed at the 13400 South intersection in 2013.

Interchanges 
UDOT has begun the process of converting several at-grade intersections into grade-separated interchanges, all of them single-point urban interchanges. The first was completed at 7800 South (SR-48) in 2012, followed by one at Redwood Road (SR-68) in 2015.

In 2016, a new interchange was completed at 600 West, the first to not replace a pre-existing intersection. At the same time, the nearby intersection at 200 West was converted to right-in/right-out access only.

Through 2017 and 2018, the Bangerter Four project converted four intersections into interchanges: 5400 South (SR-173), 7000 South, 9000 South (SR-209), and 11400 South (SR-175). The 7000 South interchange was opened in 2017, while the other three were completed in late 2018.

In spring 2020, construction began on a grade-separated interchange at 6200 South, followed by construction of similar interchanges at 12600 South (SR-71) in January 2021 and 10400 South (SR-151) in May 2021.  These three interchanges opened on May 19, 2022.

Future 
Eventually, all at-grade intersections on Bangerter Highway between I-15 and SR-201 are planned to be upgraded to grade-separated interchanges. Environmental impact statements (EIS) have been completed for Bangerter intersections at 4700 South, 9800 South, and 13400 South. Construction is anticipated to start at these three locations in Spring 2023. The interchanges at 4700 South and 13400 South will be constructed as single point urban interchanges while the interchange at 9800 South will be constructed as a tight diamond interchange to minimize impacts to the surrounding community.

Major intersections

References

 154
154
 154